Events in the year 1949 in Turkey.

Parliament
 8th Parliament of Turkey

Incumbents
President – İsmet İnönü 
Prime Minister
 Hasan Saka (up to 16 January)
Şemsettin Günaltay (from 16 January)
Leader of the opposition – Celal Bayar

Ruling party and the main opposition
 Ruling party – Republican People's Party (CHP)
 Main opposition – Democrat Party (DP)

Cabinet
17th government of Turkey (up to 10 June)
18th government of Turkey (from 10 June)

Events
14 January: Hasan Saka, the prime minister resigns.  
24 January: Nationalistic poet Behçet Kemal Çağlar resigns from CHP, protesting Şemsettin Günaltay's cabinet and claiming that the secular principle of the party was sacrificed
1 February: Religion courses offered to primary school children.
24 March: Turkey grants de facto diplomatic recognition to Israel. 
9 July: Fire in Çorum passenger ship leaves 61 dead.
8 August: Turkey admitted to Council of Europe.
17 August: 1949 Karlıova earthquake
15 October: By elections
16 November: Several members of the Nation Party were arrested on a fake assassination charge (It was claimed that they were planning to assassinate İsmet İnönü and Celal Bayar, but several days later they were released)

Births
10 January – Kemal Derviş, economist and politician
20 February – Adnan Kahveci, politician
25 February – Esmeray Diriker, singer
25 February – Sevil Atasoy, biochemist, forensic expert
21 March – Muammer Güler, politician
29 March – Kayahan Açar, singer
15 April – Kadir İnanır, actor
14 November – Güneş Taner, politician
13 December – Tarik Akan, actor
25 December – Mustafa Cengiz, businessman (died 2021)

Deaths
21 February – Ali Çetinkaya (born 1878), politician
31 December – Rıza Tevfik Bölükbaşı (born 1869), philosopher and politician

Gallery

References

 
Years of the 20th century in Turkey
Turkey
Turkey
Turkey